London All Peoples' Sports Association Football Club is a non-League football club, based in Plaistow, London, England.

History
The club was formed in 1993, corresponding with the creation of the first Asian Football League (AFL). They were originally known as Ahle Sunnah. The team was set up by a group of friends from East Ham College in Newham who teamed up with a local youth team, known as Young Muslims, who were no longer eligible to play under 16s football. London APSA were crowned the first-ever Asian League Champions.

The club competed in Asian-run competitions until they decided to join the London Intermediate League in 2000. However the club resigned pre-season and instead joined the Essex Business Houses League Senior Intermediate Division. They played in that division for three seasons, after which they joined the Essex Senior League for the start of the 2003–04 season and remained in the league until 2016.

In 2014 the club was renamed Newham Football Club. At the end of the 2015–16 season the club resigned from the Essex Senior League after finishing bottom of the table, dropping into the Essex Olympian League. The club also reverted to being named London APSA.

Club records
Highest League Position: 9th in Essex Senior League 2005–06

References

Football clubs in England
Sport in the London Borough of Newham
1993 establishments in England
Association football clubs established in 1993
Football clubs in London
Plaistow, Newham
Essex Business Houses Football League
Essex Senior Football League
Essex Olympian Football League
Diaspora sports clubs in the United Kingdom
Diaspora association football clubs in England